United Nations Security Council resolution 540, adopted on 31 October 1983, noting the report of the Secretary-General and the increased cooperation from the governments of Iran and Iraq, the Council requested he continue with the mediation efforts in the region.

Resolution 540 went on to condemn all acts in violation of the Geneva Conventions of 1949, affirming the right to free navigation in international waters. It also requested the Secretary-General Javier Pérez de Cuéllar continue in his efforts to find a way to end hostilities between the two countries and urged Iran, Iraq and other Member States to refrain from actions that could destabilise the region.

The resolution was adopted by 12 votes to none, with three abstentions from Malta, Nicaragua and Pakistan.

See also
 Iran–Iraq relations
 Iran–Iraq War
 List of United Nations Security Council Resolutions 501 to 600 (1982–1987)
 Resolutions 479, 514, 522, 552, 582, 588, 598, 612, 616, 619 and 620

References
Text of the Resolution at undocs.org

External links
 

 0540
 0540
1983 in Iran
1983 in Iraq
October 1983 events